Henry Newcombe (1835 – 26 October 1908) was an Australian cricketer. He played three first-class matches for New South Wales between 1860/61 and 1862/63.

See also
 List of New South Wales representative cricketers

References

External links
 

1835 births
1908 deaths
Australian cricketers
New South Wales cricketers
Cricketers from Sydney